A nummulite is a large lenticular fossil, characterized by its numerous coils, subdivided by septa into chambers. They are the shells of the fossil and present-day marine protozoan Nummulites, a type of foraminiferan. Nummulites commonly vary in diameter from 1.3 cm (0.5 inches) to 5 cm (2 inches) and are common in Eocene to Miocene marine rocks, particularly around southwest Asia and the Mediterranean (e.g. Eocene limestones from Egypt). Fossils up to six inches wide are found in the Middle Eocene rocks of Turkey. They are valuable as index fossils.

The ancient Egyptians used nummulite shells as coins and the pyramids were constructed using limestone that contained nummulites. It is not surprising then that the name Nummulites is a diminutive form of the Latin nummulus 'little coin', a reference to their shape.

In 1913, naturalist Randolph Kirkpatrick published a book, The Nummulosphere: an account of the Organic Origin of so-called Igneous Rocks and Abyssal Red Clays, proposing the unconventional theory that all rocks had been produced through the accumulation of forams such as Nummulites.

Gallery

References

Further reading 

 
 
 
 
 

Rotaliida
Paleocene life
Eocene life
Oligocene life
Fossil taxa described in 1801
Fossils of Colombia
Fossils of Costa Rica
Fossils of Egypt
Fossils of France
Fossils of Germany
Fossils of Greece
Fossils of Haiti
Fossils of Hungary
Fossils of India
Fossils of Indonesia
Fossils of Iran
Fossils of Israel
Fossils of Italy
Fossils of Libya
Fossils of Malaysia
Fossils of Mexico
Fossils of New Caledonia
Fossils of Oman
Fossils of Pakistan
Fossils of Panama
Fossils of Poland
Fossils of Puerto Rico
Fossils of Saudi Arabia
Fossils of Senegal
Fossils of the Seychelles
Fossils of Slovenia
Fossils of Somalia
Fossils of South Africa
Fossils of Spain
Fossils of Tanzania
Fossils of Togo
Fossils of Turkey
Fossils of Great Britain
Fossils of the United States